The 2021 Namibia Tri-Nation Series was the 8th round of the 2019–2023 ICC Cricket World Cup League 2 cricket tournament that took place in Namibia in November and December 2021. It was a tri-nation series between Namibia, Oman and the United Arab Emirates cricket teams, with the matches played as One Day International (ODI) fixtures. The ICC Cricket World Cup League 2 formed part of the qualification pathway to the 2023 Cricket World Cup. Two matches that were postponed during the 4th round in January 2020 were added to the schedule of this series. JJ Smit was named as Namibia's captain for the series, after regular captain Gerhard Erasmus was ruled out after breaking a finger during the 2021 ICC Men's T20 World Cup.

Namibia and Oman played each other in the opening two fixtures, with each team winning one match. However, just prior to the start of the series, a new variant of the COVID-19 virus was discovered in southern Africa, resulting in the remaining fixtures being called off.

Squads

Tangeni Lungameni and Shaun Fouché were also named as reserves in Namibia's squad.

Fixtures

1st ODI

2nd ODI

3rd ODI

4th ODI

5th ODI

6th ODI

7th ODI

8th ODI

References

External links
 Series home at ESPN Cricinfo

2021 in Emirati cricket
2021 in Namibian cricket
2021 in Omani cricket
International cricket competitions in 2021–22
Namibia
Namibia Tri-Nation Series
Namibia Tri-Nation Series
 Namibia Tri-Nation Series